The Tumut River, a perennial stream that is part of the Murrumbidgee catchment within the Murray–Darling basin, is located in the Snowy Mountains and South West Slopes districts of New South Wales, Australia.

Location and features

Between Cabramurra and Tumut, the natural course of the Tumut River has been altered as a result of the construction of the Snowy Mountains Scheme. A series of sixteen major dams and seven hydro-electric power stations were constructed between 1949 and 1974 to harness the flow of the Tumut and Snowy rivers. The Tumut River is impounded by six dams, located at Happy Jacks Dam, Tumut Pond Dam, Tumut Two Dam, Talbingo Dam, Jounama Dam, and Blowering Dam. Four hydro-power stations are located adjacent to the river flow. Although a relatively short river, the natural flow of the Tumut River is quite high, as it drains the snowmelt and other runoff from a large proportion of the northern Snowy Mountains. The natural flow of the river is amplified by water transferred from the Tooma River and Lake Eucumbene by the Snowy Mountains Scheme.

The river is crossed by the heritage-listed Junction Bridge at Tumut.

Etymology

Environmental concerns 
The Tumut River has been subject to considerable debate and lobbying on environmental grounds. The Tumut River has been widely documented as suffering from the effects of the un-natural flow regime resulting from the creation of the Snowy Mountain Scheme and the irrigation demand downstream of the Tumut River. Environmental damage attributed to the management of the Tumut River by the Government of New South Wales includes;

Erosion of river banks – quoted as approximating  of lost land per  of river frontage.
Waterlogging (souring) of low-lying land along the river.
Isolation of historical anabranches of the river (e.g. Holt's anabranch which is now regularly cut off at low flows.) The historic village of Brungle has been the subject of considerable media coverage on both Prime and WIN TV regarding river flows and water quality.
Thermal pollution (low water temperatures) resulting from the "bottom of the dam" outlet of Blowering Dam.
Rock facing of river banks to attempt to control erosion caused by high irrigation flows.

Sporting and leisure activities 
The Tumut River has been a popular destination for a variety of sport and leisure activities including;

Canoeing/Kayaking – there are many excellent opportunities for canoeing downstream of Blowering Dam. Canoeing activities are often limited to higher flows as winter low flows are very difficult to paddle. The Tumut Valley Canoe Club are regular paddlers of the Tumut River. They meet at 5pm on Wednesday during Summer at their clubhouse which is next to the Riverglade caravan park Tumut.
Fishing – Fishing on the Tumut River is now limited to cold water species e.g. introduced trout species. The low temperatures of the river due to the bottom of the dam releases from Blowering Dam have virtually eliminated native fish species.

See also

 List of rivers of Australia
 List of rivers of New South Wales (L–Z)
 Rivers of New South Wales
 Round Mountain
 Tooma River

References

External links
 
 

Snowy Mountains Scheme
Rivers of New South Wales
Rivers in the Riverina
Tributaries of the Murrumbidgee River